David Álvarez Aguirre (born 5 February 1984), known as Kily, is an Equatoguinean footballer who plays for Spanish club La Madalena de Morcín CF mainly as a right midfielder but also as a right back.

He spent his entire career in Spain, but never in higher than Segunda División B.

Kily represented Equatorial Guinea at the 2012 Africa Cup of Nations.

Early life
Kily was born in Avilés, Asturias, Spain to a Spanish mother and an Equatoguinean father, never knowing the latter.

Club career
After finishing his youth career with the club, Kily started playing with Real Oviedo, having the honour of scoring its first-ever goal in Tercera División. He spent his entire career in the Spanish lower leagues, also representing UP Langreo (two spells), Atlético Madrid B, Orihuela CF, Novelda CF, Marino de Luanco, SD Noja, CD Cudillero and L'Entregu CF.

In 2018, Kily helped La Madalena de Morcín CF to their first promotion ever to the fourth level.

International career
Kily made his debut for Equatorial Guinea in 2007. He was selected in the squad that appeared at the 2012 Africa Cup of Nations on home soil, where on 25 January he scored arguably the country's most important goal, netting in the 90th minute for a 2–1 group stage win against Senegal, which meant the hosts qualified to the quarter-finals at the expense of their opponents.

International goals
''Scores and results show Equatorial Guinea's goal tally first. Score column gives score after Alvarez's goal.

References

External links

Stats at FútbolEsta 

1984 births
Living people
People from Avilés
Citizens of Equatorial Guinea through descent
Spanish sportspeople of Equatoguinean descent
Equatoguinean people of Spanish descent
Equatoguinean people of Asturian descent
Spanish footballers
Equatoguinean footballers
Footballers from Asturias
Association football defenders
Association football midfielders
Segunda División B players
Tercera División players
Divisiones Regionales de Fútbol players
Real Oviedo players
UP Langreo footballers
Atlético Madrid B players
Orihuela CF players
Novelda CF players
Marino de Luanco footballers
Equatorial Guinea international footballers
2012 Africa Cup of Nations players